The 2011 Georgetown Hoyas football team represented Georgetown University in the 2011 NCAA Division I FCS football season. The Hoyas were led by sixth-year head coach Kevin Kelly and played their home games at Multi-Sport Field. They were a member of the Patriot League. They finished the season 8–3, 4–2 in Patriot League play to finish in a tie for second place.

Schedule

References

Georgetown
Georgetown Hoyas football seasons
Georgetown Hoyas football